During Operation Iraqi Freedom, Operation Planet X was a US Army mechanized raid conducted on a village near Ad-Dawr in Salah Al-Din province  north of Tikrit on the night of 15 May 2003 by elements of the 1st Brigade Combat Team, U.S. 4th Infantry Division and Task Force Ironhorse in search of Ba'ath party members and militants.

The name of the operation may have been inspired by the cartoon Duck Dodgers in the 24½th Century.

As a result of this effort a key member of the former regime, Gen. Mahdi Al-Duri Al-Tikrit Adil Abdallah was captured along with 260 other prisoners.

US fighting forces involved roughly 500 soldiers, 18 M2A3 Bradley Fighting Vehicles, 12 artillery pieces, 30 HMMWVs, and 6 patrol boats.

Military Units Involved
US forces reported to be involved were
1st Brigade Combat Team, U.S. 4th Infantry Division
Task Force Ironhorse
1st Squadron, 11th Armored Cavalry Regiment

Iraqi Units involved
4th Battalion, 1st Iraqi Army
2nd Battalion, 3rd Iraqi Army

Casualties
No US, Coalition or Iraqi casualties or deaths were reported during the operation.

References

Statistics source: GlobalSecurity.org: Operation Planet X

Military operations of the Iraq War involving the United States
Military operations of the Iraq War involving Iraq
Military operations of the Iraq War in 2003
Iraqi insurgency (2003–2011)